Assara terebrella is a moth of the  family Pyralidae. It is found in Europe, Korea, Japan (Hokkaido) and eastern Siberia.

The wingspan is 21–24 mm. The moth flies from May to September depending on the location.

The larvae feed on Norway spruce.

References

External links
 Lepidoptera of Belgium
 Assara terebrella at UKmoths

Moths described in 1818
Phycitini
Moths of Europe
Moths of Asia